Jacksonena delicata is a species of air-breathing land snails, terrestrial pulmonate gastropod mollusks in the family Camaenidae. This species is endemic to Australia.

References 

Gastropods of Australia
delicata
Gastropods described in 1912
Taxonomy articles created by Polbot
Taxobox binomials not recognized by IUCN